Robert Lee Karnes is an American politician born in and representing West Virginia. He is known for controversial, conservative rhetoric. He is a Republican member of the West Virginia Senate, representing the 11th district from January 14, 2015 until 2019 and from November 30, 2020 to current date.

Karnes initially took office after defeating Incumbent Democrat Senator Greg Tucker in 2014. This was the first election cycle in which West Virginian Republicans gained control in either the state House or Senate in over 80 years. Karnes then won re-election in the 2020 General Election after defeating Incumbent Republican Senator John Pitsenbarger in the 2020 Republican primary and Democrat Denise Campbell in the general election.

Election results

Controversies
During the 2018-19 teacher strikes, Karnes stated he believed that the strikes "won't have any significant effect."

During the Covid-19 pandemic, 2021, Senator Robert Karnes wore a mesh mask in protest of the state mask mandates and CDC guidelines by wearing masks without face-coverings while conducting official duties.

Senator Robert Karnes was recently the only senator to vote against the Film Tax Credit, noting it would benefit Bette Midler more than West Virginia residents. It afforded him headlines via National news media.

References

8. 
https://www.fox5dc.com/news/west-virginia-lawmakers-photographed-wearing-improper-masks-while-conducting-official-duties

10. https://theintercept.com/2018/05/11/west-virginia-primary-teacher-strikes/

11. https://www.huffpost.com/entry/west-virginia-film-tax-credit-bette-midler-robert-karnes_n_62292682e4b029615836148c

1969 births
Living people
People from South Charleston, West Virginia
People from Upshur County, West Virginia
People from Randolph County, West Virginia
Republican Party West Virginia state senators
21st-century American politicians